Christian Viera Álvarez (born 1972) is a Chilean lawyer who was elected as a member of the Chilean Constitutional Convention.

References

External links
 BCN Profile

Living people
1972 births
21st-century Chilean politicians
Pontifical Catholic University of Valparaíso alumni
Alberto Hurtado University alumni
University of Deusto alumni
Members of the Chilean Constitutional Convention
People from Curicó